Tosrin bin Jarvanthi is a Malaysian politician and currently serves as Johor State Executive Councillor.

Election Results

Honours

Honours of Malaysia
  :
  Member of the Order of the Defender of the Realm (AMN) (1982)
  :
  Second Class of the Sultan Ibrahim Medal (PIS II)
  Second Class of the Star of Sultan Ismail (BSI II)

References 

Living people
People from Johor
Malaysian people of Malay descent
Malaysian Muslims
Malaysian United Indigenous Party politicians
21st-century Malaysian politicians
Members of the Johor State Legislative Assembly
Johor state executive councillors
Members of the Order of the Defender of the Realm
1950 births
Former United Malays National Organisation politicians